Glucan 1,6-alpha-isomaltosidase (exo-isomaltohydrolase, isomalto-dextranase, isomaltodextranase, G2-dextranase, 1,6-alpha-D-glucan isomaltohydrolase) is an enzyme with systematic name 6-alpha-D-glucan isomaltohydrolase. This enzyme catalyses the following chemical reaction

 Hydrolysis of (1->6)-alpha-D-glucosidic linkages in polysaccharides, to remove successive isomaltose units from the non-reducing ends of the chains

Optimum activity is on those 1,6-alpha-D-glucans containing 6, 7 and 8 glucose units.

References

External links 
 

EC 3.2.1